The seventh and final season of Designing Women premiered on CBS on September 25, 1992, and concluded on May 24, 1993. The season consisted of 22 episodes. Created by Linda Bloodworth-Thomason, the series was produced by Bloodworth/Thomason Mozark Productions in association with Columbia Pictures Television.

Cast

Main cast
 Dixie Carter as Julia Sugarbaker
 Annie Potts as Mary Jo Shively
 Jan Hooks as Carlene Frazier-Dobber
 Judith Ivey as Bonnie Jean "BJ" Poteet
 Meshach Taylor as Anthony Bouvier

Recurring cast
 Ray McKinnon as Dwayne Dobber
 Alice Ghostley as Bernice Clifton
 Sheryl Lee Ralph as Etienne Toussant Bouvier
 Patrick Warburton as Craig Coleman

Guest cast

 James Naughton as Phillip Russell Stuart
 Clyde Kusatsu as Lewis
 Della Reese as Mrs. Toussant 
 Sherman Hemsley as Mr. Toussant 
 Beah Richards as Mrs. Bouvier
 Marius Weyers as Nigel McFeeney

 Peri Gilpin as Jade Henson
 Ron Glass as Michael "Punch" Alexander
 Pat Carroll as Mrs. Beecham
 Greg Kean as Eric Hobart
 James Karen as Kearney 
 Gail O'Grady as Kiki Kearney

Episodes

DVD release
The seventh and final season was released on DVD by Shout! Factory on July 17, 2012.

References

External links
 

Designing Women seasons
1992 American television seasons
1993 American television seasons